, also known as  or Fushimi-Momoyama Castle, is a Japanese castle located in Fushimi Ward, Kyoto.

Fushimi Castle was constructed from 1592 to 1594 by Toyotomi Hideyoshi at the end of the Sengoku period as his retirement residence. Fushimi Castle was destroyed in 1596 and rebuilt before eventually being demolished in 1623 and its site later used for the tomb of Emperor Meiji. The current Fushimi Castle is a replica constructed in 1964 near the original site in Fushimi.

The Azuchi-Momoyama period of Japanese history partially takes its name from Fushimi Castle.

History 

The construction of the original Fushimi Castle was begun in 1592, the year after Toyotomi Hideyoshi's retirement from the regency, and completed in 1594. Twenty provinces provided workers for the construction, which numbered between 20,000 and 30,000.

Though bearing the external martial appearance of a castle, the structure was intended as a retirement palace for Hideyoshi, and was furnished and decorated as such. It is particularly famous for its Golden Tea Room in which both the walls and the implements were covered in gold leaf. The castle was intended to be the site for Hideyoshi's peace talks with Chinese diplomats seeking an end to the Seven-Year War in Korea, but an earthquake destroyed the castle entirely only two years after its completion.

It was rebuilt soon afterwards, and came to be controlled by Torii Mototada, a vassal of Tokugawa Ieyasu. In 1600, the castle fell in a famous and significant siege by Ishida Mitsunari. Torii Mototada, in a celebrated act of honor and bravery, defended the castle for eleven days, delaying Ishida's forces and allowing his lord Tokugawa time to build his own army. This had a profound effect on the Battle of Sekigahara, which came soon afterwards, and which marked the final victory of Tokugawa Ieyasu over all his rivals.

In 1623, the castle was dismantled, and many of its rooms and buildings were incorporated into castles and temples across Japan. Several temples in Kyoto, such as Yōgen-in (養源院), Genkō-an (源光庵), and Hōsen-in (宝泉院), have a blood-stained ceiling that had been the floor of a corridor at Fushimi Castle where Torii Mototada and company had committed suicide.

In 1912, the tomb of Emperor Meiji was built on the original site of the castle. The castle was not rebuilt until 1964, when a replica was created very nearby and primarily in concrete. The new structure served as a museum of the life and campaigns of Toyotomi Hideyoshi, and the main attraction of a small theme park called "Castle Land", but was closed to the public in 2003. The castle grounds, however, were reopened in 2007.

See also 
Jurakudai—Hideyoshi's previous luxurious residence from 1587 to 1594

References

Further reading 

 

 
 Sansom, George (1961). A History of Japan: 1334–1615. Stanford, California: Stanford University Press.
 Turnbull, Stephen (2003). Japanese Castles 1540–1640. Oxford: Osprey Publishing.

External links 
 SengokuDaimyo.com : The website of Samurai Author and Historian Anthony J. Bryant.  Accessed 4 April 2011.

1590s establishments in Japan
Buildings and structures in Kyoto
Castles in Kyoto Prefecture
Houses completed in 1594
Tourist attractions in Kyoto
Rebuilt buildings and structures in Japan